Fox 43 may refer to one of the following television stations in the United States:
KTMJ-CD, Fox affiliate in Topeka, Kansas 
WFXB, Fox affiliate in Myrtle Beach, South Carolina
WPMT, Fox affiliate in Harrisburg, Pennsylvania
WTNZ, Fox affiliate in Knoxville, Tennessee
WVBT, Fox affiliate in Virginia Beach, Virginia